San Diego State Aztecs Rugby Club is the rugby union club of San Diego State University in San Diego, California. It fields both men's and women's teams, the men compete in Division 1-A in the California conference and the women play in the Pacific Desert conference of Division II.  The Aztec men's team won the US National Collegiate Rugby Championship in 1987.

Teams

Men's team
Since the inception of the club in 1958, men's rugby has been both a popular and successful sport on campus at SDSU, so much so that Aztec alumni went on to set-up the rugby team of Old Mission Beach Athletic Club (OMBAC) in 1966 and also to found San Diego Old Aztecs RFC in 1978. In addition to the 1987 National Championship, the Aztecs have won numerous SCRFU Collegiate Conference titles to progress to the national playoffs, including 1996, 2007, 2008 (quarterfinalists), 2009 (semifinalists), 2010 (quarterfinalists) and 2012 (semifinalists). San Diego State men's teams have also excelled at the short-form of the game; finishing second at the 2010 Collegiate Rugby Championship (broadcast live on NBC) and qualifying to play in the USA Rugby Sevens Collegiate National Championships in 2011 (quarterfinalists), 2012 and 2015 (quarterfinalists).

Women's team
Women  first represented San Diego State at rugby in 1975 and, like the men, had an astonishingly successful introduction, finishing the season second in the nation after losing the inaugural Women's Collegiate National Championship to the University of Colorado. The team played successfully for eleven seasons, even going on an undefeated four-match tour of New Zealand in 1981. In 1986 the Aztecs combined with a local club team the Rio Grande Surfers. The Surfers, now known as the San Diego Surfers, play in the Women's Premier League, the highest level of women's rugby in the United States. The Aztec women's team has recently been re-established on campus and they were progressing through the 2020 season until it was cut-short by the COVID-19 pandemic.

Club history

Founding and inaugural season

The first record of anyone having an interest in playing rugby at San Diego State College (as it was then) is an advertisement in the school newspaper, The Daily Aztec, at the end of the fall semester of 1957 asking for Men interested in forming a rugby team to attend a meeting. More than 45 people turned up so a season schedule was put together along with a timetable of practices to be held over the winter break and Mr. Fred Quiett of the university's Engineering Department agreed to become the club's first faculty representative.

The team played its first competitive matches in the spring semester at the Southern California Rugby Football Union Carnival in Santa Ana on Sunday February 9, 1958, defeating Pomona-Claremont 8–0 and losing to the Pepperdine College Waves 3–8. The first of seven league matches that season was played against El Centro in El Centro on Saturday February 15, the Aztecs won 15–0. Their next match was their first at home, it was played in the Aztec Bowl (now the site of the Viejas Arena) against Ontario and was won by the Aztecs 20–14.

Winning ways continued that first Cinderella season with a further three victories before suffering their first league defeat to Eagle Rock Athletic Club. This set-up their final match with Santa Ana College on the next weekend as a championship decider, the Aztecs won the match and thus they also clinched the league in their inaugural season. Four of the team were named on the Southern California All star team (Bob Johnston, Ernie Trumper, Jim Hansen and Ian Richardson), two to the All-star second team (Bob Shank and Jim Hastings) and one honorable-mention (Ray Fackrell).

National championship
The Aztecs won the US National Men's Collegiate Rugby Championship in 1987, overcoming Dartmouth College rugby club 22–6 in the semifinals and beating the United States Air Force Academy rugby club 10–9 in the final.  The 1987 men's rugby team was inducted into the San Diego State University Aztec Hall of Fame in 2005.

Notable alumni

International fifteens players

Alumni of San Diego State who have played international rugby union
  Sean Allen
  Scott Bracken   
  Derrick Broussard 
  Dan Dorsey   
  Ante Drazina
  Dennis Gonzalez
  Chris Harju   
  Duncan Kelm
  Chris Lippert   
  Craig Levine   
  Chris O'Brien   
  Mike Saunders   
  Brian Vizard   
  Scott Yungling

Professional fifteens players

Alumni of San Diego State who have played professional rugby union
 Derrick Broussard  
 Gil Covey  
 Dan Dorsey  
 Nico Gilli (SDSU 2018–2021)  
 Kalei Konrad  
 Nick Lupian  
 Austin Switzer  
 Ryan Walls

International sevens players

Alumni of San Diego State who have played international rugby sevens
  Derrick Broussard
  Dennis Gonzalez
  Duncan Kelm
  Mike Saunders –– US Rugby Hall of Fame inductee 2018 
  Stephen Tomasin –– All-American (7s and 15s), Bronze medalist at 2015 Pan American Games and participant at the 2018 Rugby World Cup Sevens
  Brian Vizard –– US Rugby Hall of Fame inductee 2016

Professional sevens players

 Stephen Tomasin –– One of the first players ever signed by Premier Rugby Sevens (PR7s) in 2021

Collegiate All-Americans and Junior Internationals

Students and alumni of San Diego State who have been awarded All-American honors for rugby, played for the US Junior All Americans (U20s), the US Collegiate All Americans (U23s) or who have played international rugby at a junior level for another nation.

Rugby coaches and administrators

Alumni of San Diego State who have become coaches and/or administrators of rugby at the highest level
 Nic Benson –– Deputy Commissioner Major League Rugby
 Reldon “Bing” Dawson –– US Rugby Hall of Fame inductee 2018 
 Played rugby and football at San Diego State University graduating in 1967
 Began his coaching career under Don Coryell and John Madden as a Graduate Assistant at SDSU
 Coached OMBAC for 20 years creating a rugby powerhouse
 US 7's Club Champions 1985, 1995, 2000, 2001, 2002, and 2006
 US 15's Champions 1988, 1989, 1991, 1993, 1994, and 1996
 Rugby Super League Champions 2006
 more than 70 OMBAC players coached by Dawson between 1985 and 2006 represented the U.S. in 7's or 15's
 He also coached Southern California Griffins, the Pacific Coast Grizzlies and the U.S. Eagles National Teams
 Cornel Muller –– Operations and Production Manager at Major League Rugby
 Giovanni Vaglietti –– Executive Director, USA Youth and High School Rugby (the sanctioned body for all Youth & High School Rugby across the country)
 Born and raised in South Africa, Vaglietti came to San Diego State University on an athletic scholarship
 He worked in San Diego State University’s Athletic Department
 He also worked at the Australian Open, the BNP Paribas Open and ClubCorp
 Previously CEO of Southern California Youth Rugby
 Bob Watkins –– US Rugby Hall of Fame inductee 2015 
 played rugby for San Diego State University, Old Mission Beach Athletic Club and the Southern California XV.
 Founding Director of U.S.A. Rugby Football Union (Director 1975-1991, President 1983-1987 & 1989-1991)
 Managed U.S. Eagles versus Canada, U.S.S.R., South Africa, New Zealand, England, Wales and Hong Kong
 Past President of the Pacific Coast and Southern California Rugby Football Unions
 Chairman of the U.S. Rugby Super League and U.S. Rugby Foundation.

Notable coaches

Former coaches of San Diego State Aztec rugby who have played and/or coached international and/or professional rugby
 Scott Bracken
  player
  head coach
 Steve Gray
  player and captain, 
  player, captain and assistant coach
  assistant coach
 US Rugby Hall of Fame inductee 2016, Gray coached the Aztecs to the National Championship in 1987.
 Matt Hawkins –– SDSU Assistant and later Head Coach 2008 - 2010 
  player
  player and head coach
 Dan Payne
  player (2007) and assistant coach (2011 Rugby World Cup)
  head coach 2009
 USA Rugby Chief Executive Officer 2016
 USA Rugby General Manager of High Performance 2021
 Coached the Aztecs 2006–2009
 Matt Sherman
  player and assistant coach
  head coach
 Sherman spent two seasons as San Diego State's head coach, leading the Aztecs to the Final Four in 2009 and the National quarterfinals a year later.
 Zack Test
  player
  Pan American Games bronze medallist
  player
 San Diego Legion assistant coach (2017-2020) and co-head coach (2020–)

References

External links
 
 

 
University and college rugby union clubs in the United States
Women's rugby union teams in the United States
Rugby union teams in California
Rugby union teams in San Diego
Rugby clubs established in 1958
Sports organizations established in 1958
1958 establishments in the United States
1958 establishments in California
Women's sports in California